Two ships of the United States Navy have been named USS Sam Houston.

 The first  was a schooner serving during the American Civil War.
 The second  was an  serving during the Cold War, named for the President of the Republic of Texas.

United States Navy ship names